Esquire Network was an American pay television network that was a 50/50 joint venture between NBCUniversal and the Hearst Corporation. The network carried programs aimed at a metrosexual audience centering on travel, cooking, sports and fashion, along with reruns of popular sitcoms and dramas.

History

Style Network

The channel was originally launched as the Style Network (although on-air promotions typically referred to it as simply "Style") on October 1, 1998, serving as a spin-off of E!. It was intended to leverage E!'s coverage of fashion and to provide an expanded venue for shows such as Fashion Emergency. The network focused on fashion, design, interior decoration and urban lifestyle-related programming. Style provided coverage of events like New York Fashion Week and showcased various designers. Early programming included: The Look for Less, Shabby Chic with Rachel Ashwell, Glow: The Beauty Show, Vogue Takes..., Stylemaker, Model, Runway, Dining with Style, and Homes with Style. Around 2003, the channel began airing a variety of "makeover" shows. The home makeover show Clean House lasted for ten seasons on the network; How Do I Look? lasted eight seasons.

Starting around 2008, Style shifted its focus to personality-based reality programing such as Jerseylicious, Tia & Tamera, and Big Rich Texas, along with a female-focused spin-off of The Soup known as The Dish. On June 25, 2012, the Style Network was rebranded with a revised logo and a new slogan: "Work it. Love it. Style it." In 2013, the channel launched two real estate related shows: Hot Listings: Miami and Built, which featured male models remodeling houses.

Esquire Network transition
In December 2012, NBCUniversal signed a brand licensing deal with the Hearst Corporation, owner of Esquire magazine, to relaunch G4 into Esquire Network, which would air shows aimed at a metrosexual audience about travel, cooking, fashion and other male-targeted programming that is not sports related, including the addition of acquired and archived program content from the NBCUniversal library such as Party Down, Parks and Recreation and week-delayed episodes of Late Night with Jimmy Fallon.

The rebranding was scheduled to take place on April 22, 2013, but was moved to an unspecified date in the summer on April 15, 2013, as network general manager Adam Stotsky stated the rebranding was pushed back in order to have a broader slate of original series to launch than would have been available for the April launch. In May 2013, the launch date was pushed to September 23, 2013, with its first program being an 80th anniversary special on Esquire which was rebroadcast later in primetime.

On September 9, 2013, NBCUniversal announced that it would replace Style Network with Esquire Network, leaving G4 "as is for the foreseeable future, though it's highly unlikely the company will invest in more original programming" according to The Hollywood Reporter. One of the factors was likely Style's distribution on DirecTV, giving Esquire more homes at launch with the Style channel slot than they would have had with G4 (G4 had earlier been dropped by DirecTV in 2010 due to the channel's low viewership and had never been able to come to terms on a new carriage agreement). 

This forced last-second changes to Esquire Network's planned schedule outside of primetime. Cable-edited reruns of Sex and the City (a series which took heavy criticism from Esquire magazine during its original run) remained on its schedule until December 2013 (when the rights were shifted to E!), with most of Style's series quietly shelved, or transferred to E!, Bravo and Oxygen. International versions of Style Network continued to exist several years after, as the Esquire brand license was restricted solely to the United States. The original iteration of G4 ceased on December 31, 2014.

The sudden change in networks surprised both viewers and providers, who had already shifted or expected the G4 channel space to a more appropriate place among other men's networks, and now had to deal with shifting Esquire's channel position away from women's networks, along with having to answer customer inquiries about the sudden demise of the Style Network and its programming. More privately, talent which had been brought on for Style programming, including the Mowry twins, reacted angrily to seeing their projects cancelled without notice or be shifted among other networks with different programming priorities, and NBCUniversal would have to deal with the repercussions of ending a network's life with only two weeks' notice.

Style made no mention of the oncoming rebranding until September 18, when a 60-second farewell clip was posted on its YouTube channel serving as a retrospective of the network's history and ending with a thanks to the channel's audience for their viewership. Other social media platforms for individual Style programs also began to mention the end of the network on that day. The last program to air on Style on September 22, 2013, was an overnight repeat of the Tia & Tamera season finale episode "Twerkin' 9 to 5" (which became its de facto series finale as Tia and Tamera Mowry opted not to continue with the series) at 2 a.m. Eastern Time, with the nightly three-hour paid programming block leading into the Esquire Network launch special after a 30-second abbreviated version of the Style farewell clip aired on the channel space. The changeover occurred on September 23, 2013 at 6 a.m. Eastern Time.

2016–2017 carriage decline
Throughout 2015 and into 2016, the majority of the original programs produced for Esquire Network ended up being low-rated, with only the youth football reality series Friday Night Tykes and the network's Men in Blazers–produced live broadcasts of Pamplona's running of the bulls receiving any critical acclaim or notice. The rest of its lineup was criticized for depending on derivative and "copycat" formats of better programming, which was often found on other networks or produced for free consumption independently and uploaded to streaming video providers such as YouTube and Vimeo. After only several months, the network stopped airing repeats of Late Night with Jimmy Fallon after its February 2014 end, immediately upon his move to the higher-profile Tonight Show, which NBC refused to dilute the value of with cable repeats.

American Ninja Warrior, which had started on G4, was expected to be a linchpin of Esquire Network's lineup, but with the delay of the network's launch to the fall of 2013, NBCUniversal did not want to wait to launch the season, and the program had success airing on NBC during the summer as repeats in previous seasons. The show's sixth season, which had been taped expecting to air as part of Esquire Network and visually featured its logo in prominent places, then moved to NBC for the 2014 summer season, and airing as a new season on the broadcast network, proved the show's worth with great ratings. NBCUniversal decided to move the series permanently to NBC, leaving Esquire Network with repeats rather than new episodes, and even before its launch, removing one of the network's G4-era critical series from being used to promote its other content.

Though it did receive a spin-off as consolation, Team Ninja Warrior, Esquire Network had no other compatible programming to promote it, and it never cracked the top 100 cable shows in any of its first season airings. It was moved to USA Network for its second season and beyond.

Press attention for the network's programming soon was limited to the bookends of their premieres, then to their eventual notice of cancellation, including little to no promotion from Esquire magazine itself due to a lack of compatible promotion. The magazine, which under the brand licensing deal was expected to be used to source new series ideas or its writers participating in factual programming such as countdowns, was also severely underutilized, with most of the content developed for the network ending up being from traditional talent pipelines used by NBCUniversal, rather than the magazine itself.

Due to these multiple issues, the network began to carry more repeats of existing library comedy and drama series (many of which were seen over-the-air for free on sister network Cozi TV and MeTV and NBC's streaming apps, along with other NBCU networks), which again brought the network towards the same issues befalling G4 and Cloo, where little original content being produced made it a network viewers and providers claimed provided little value for its monthly carriage fees.

On October 1, 2016, Dish Network removed the channel from the lineup. As with their earlier dropping of Cloo, the provider stated that most of the network's rerun-centric programming was duplicative of that available on other networks and streaming services. The only notice of the dropping was through the provider's monthly billing statement. AT&T then gave notice that Esquire Network would be dropped from U-verse and DirecTV on December 15, 2016, a move that cut the network's availability by 25% and removed almost all consumer-based satellite service availability outside of niche C-Band consumers. Charter Communications through its Time Warner Cable, Bright House Networks and Spectrum subsidiaries removed the channel from their lineup nationwide on April 25, 2017 (the same day they removed Chiller from their lineup, also nationwide), leaving Verizon FiOS and Google Fiber as a few of the last cable providers to carry Esquire Network until its demise; online access to the network's TV Everywhere live feed was maintained by Charter until the network's termination.

End of operations
On January 18, 2017, it was announced that the network would end all pay television distribution in the summer of 2017 and convert to an online-only model. The network went off the air on June 28 at noon Eastern time. The network programmed a final marathon of Friday Night Tykes that day, ending with the season one finale, "Finish What We Started". After the episode ended, a "thank you" slide was shown with the network's web address (which shortly thereafter was turned into a redirect to the main Esquire website), after which the channel space created by the Style Network in 1998 folded and ceased to exist. No further comment was made in regards to the supposed online-only version of the network, and Esquire's "TV" section on their website now contains the general features and behind-the-scenes footage prevalent on most magazine sites. The network's final two projects, Edgehill (a true crime series about the Murder of Suzanne Jovin) and Borderland USA (a reality series about the U.S. Border Patrol Tactical Unit) were promised to air on the new digital version of the network, but have since been abandoned.

By coincidence, G4's Canadian network outlived both its mother American network and the Esquire Network, ending operations on August 31, 2017, two months longer than Esquire.

G4 would relaunch in the United States a new hybrid cable-digital form on November 16, 2021 after a year of lead-up promotions and announcements, returning to public prominence in a smaller, but much smoother process than the entire launch of Esquire Network. However, G4 would shut down less than one year starting.

Programming

International

Internationally, Style Network was launched in the Arab world in December 2007 on Showtime Arabia, across Southern and Western Africa during back in November 2007 on DStv, in the United Kingdom and Ireland on June 10, 2008, in Japan on World on Demand, Australia in November 2009, and Poland in August 2011. The network was also launched in CEE, from February 19, 2011 until May 1, 2014

Style Network continues to air in international markets, though its British/Irish version ceased operations on December 9, 2013, while its African version ceased operations on March 31, 2015. The brand licensing agreement with Hearst for Esquire Network was exclusive to the United States, and NBCU and Hearst never pursued any international versions for Esquire Network.

In 2014, the Australian version of the Style Network made its first local commission, Fashion Bloggers, after its American counterpart rebranded. Style Australia shut down on 17 December 2019 as part of a restructuring of NBCU's Australian operations and a broad re-map of Foxtel's channel lineup.

References

Defunct television networks in the United States
Esquire (magazine)
Television channels and stations established in 1998
Television channels and stations disestablished in 2017
1998 establishments in the United States
2017 disestablishments in California
Men's interest channels
NBCUniversal networks
Former subsidiaries of The Walt Disney Company